The "Theriaca" is the longest surviving work of the 2nd-century BC Greek poet Nicander of Colophon.

It is a 958-line hexameter poem describing the nature of venomous creatures, including snakes, spiders, and scorpions, and the wounds that they inflict. 

Nicander also wrote the companion work Alexipharmaca, which explored other poisons and venoms.

Etymology
A corresponding English noun theriac also exists.

Content
It has been noted that Theriaca is a poem not solely concerned with its intended subject matter, given its "arcane language". Nicander makes references to a drakōn, however it is likely this term is utilized to refer to an Aesculapian snake rather than a dragon in the contemporary perception of the word.

References

Further reading
Weitzmann, Kurt, ed., Age of spirituality: late antique and early Christian art, third to seventh century, no. 226, 1979, Metropolitan Museum of Art, New York, ; full text available online from The Metropolitan Museum of Art Libraries

Ancient Greek poems
2nd-century BC works